U2 small nuclear ribonucleoprotein auxiliary factor 35 kDa subunit-related protein 2 is a protein that in humans is encoded by the ZRSR2 gene.

This gene encodes an essential splicing factor. The encoded protein associates with the U2 auxiliary factor heterodimer, which is required for the recognition of a functional 3' splice site in pre-mRNA splicing, and may play a role in network interactions during spliceosome assembly.

References

Further reading